Governor Stanford may refer to:

Leland Stanford (1824–1893), Governor of California
Gov. Stanford, locomotive that was named for him
Rawghlie Clement Stanford (1879–1963), Governor of Arizona